Cosmosoma achemon is a moth of the family Erebidae. It was described by Johan Christian Fabricius in 1781. It is found from the Antilles to Santarém in Pará, Brazil.

References

achemon
Moths described in 1781